Prince Gwangneung or Prince Gwangreung (died May 1310), personal name Wang Gam was a Goryeo Royal Prince as the first and oldest son of King Chungseon and Consort Ui. 

In 1298, he was appointed as the part of Yeongga Army Envoy (영가군승선사, 永嘉軍承宣使) and a year later he honoured "Prince Gwangneung" before later became the Crown Prince (세자, 世子). While his father in Yuan Dynasty, he wanted to hand over the throne to Gwangneung, but it was stopped due to the persuasion of his followers. However, he got involved in the issue of throne's succession those made him sentenced to death and murdered by his own father due to some accusations and misunderstandings in Yuan, along with his servant, Gim Ui-jung (김의중, 金義重). Not long after this, his body was transported and returned to Seongnam, Goryeo for the funeral and burial in the Southern Part of one of the Gaegyeong's fortress. Although his birth date was unknown, but it seems that Wang Gam died before reach 20-years-old.

References

Prince Gwangneung on Encykorea .

Korean princes
Year of birth unknown
Date of birth unknown
1310 deaths
13th-century Korean people